Dukat may refer to:

Dukat (currency), or ducat, a gold coin produced in Europe over many centuries
Dukat (Star Trek), a character from  Star Trek: Deep Space Nine
Sandy Dukat (born 1972), American Paralympic athlete
Dukat (company), a Croatian food and dairy processing company

Places
Dukat, Albania, a village
Dukat, Russia, an urban-type settlement in Omsukchansky District, Magadan Oblast, Russia
Dukat (Bosilegrad), a village in Serbia
Dukat (Gadžin Han), a village in Serbia
Dukat (mountain), a mountain in Serbia that is the source of the Pčinja River

See also

Dukhat, a character from Babylon 5
Ducat (disambiguation)